Boyling is a surname. Notable people with the surname include:

Christian Boyling, 17th-century scientific instrument maker
Mark Boyling (born 1952), British Anglican dean
Sid Boyling (1914–2006), Canadian broadcaster